Đất Đỏ is a rural district of Bà Rịa–Vũng Tàu province in the Southeast region of Vietnam. As of 2003, the district had a population of 62,683. The district covers an area of 190 km². The district capital lies at Phước Hải.  

This district is the home area of the prominent communist Võ Thị Sáu.

Administrative divisions
The district is divided administratively into 2 townships: Đất Đỏ, the capital, and Phước Hải. Đất Đỏ contains the following wards: Phước Long Thọ, Long Tân, Láng Dài, Lộc An, Phước Hội and Long Mỹ.

References

Districts of Bà Rịa-Vũng Tàu province
Bà Rịa-Vũng Tàu province